Rebecca Lim (born 26 September 1986) is a Singaporean actress who won Best Actress in a leading role at the Asian Television Awards and two Best Actress in a Leading Role awards, a Best Supporting Actress award and 10 consecutive Top 10 Most Popular Female Artiste in the local Star Awards ceremony from 2012 to 2022. Lim also won Best Performance in a Leading Role at the Seoul International Drama Awards. Lim has been the cover girl for numerous fashion magazines, and has been invited to Paris Fashion Week 2019 for Christian Dior and Hermes show. In 2020, Lim was awarded the Best Actress National Winner - Malaysia for her performance in The Bridge.

Early life and education 
Lim was born on 26 September 1986 and is the second among three children in a Hokkien family.

She studied at CHIJ Saint Nicholas Girls' School for her pre-school, primary, and secondary education, followed by Victoria Junior College and Singapore Management University (SMU) for her tertiary education.

Lim participated in the Miss Singapore Universe pageant while studying for a degree in Accountancy, majoring in Law at Singapore Management University. She was awarded the Miss Photogenic title, and not long after, she was spotted as a talent and signed on as a part-time actress with Mediacorp. She made the transition to being a full-time actress after her graduation.

Career 
Her first leading role in a drama came in 2008 – The Truth, where she co-starred with Tay Ping Hui and Joanne Peh. However, she was criticised for her command of the Chinese language.

In 2009, Lim starred in Fighting Spiders, which garnered positive reviews for her portrayal of Susie Woon, a prostitute. In 2010, the drama had a second season which won her the honours of Actress of the Year at ELLE Singapore Awards 2010.

In 2010, Lim starred in the award-winning Channel 5 law production, The Pupil, where she played a trainee lawyer, Wendy Lim, in Roberts & Fongs. Her performance in The Pupil earned her the Best Actress in a Leading Role at the 2010 Asian Television Awards.

In 2012, Rebecca's Mandarin breakthrough role was her portrayal of a psychiatrist in the Channel 8 drama Unriddle 2. Her performance earned her a Top 10 Most Popular Female Artistes accolade at the annual Star Awards 2012. This was her first nomination and consequently her first win in the category.

In 2013, Lim was nominated for the Best Actress award for Star Awards 2013 for her role in Unriddle 2, her first nomination in the category.

In 2014, Lim was nominated for both the Best Actress and the Best Supporting Actress awards in Star Awards 20 for her roles in Sudden and The Dream Makers respectively. She won the Best Supporting Actress award for her role as the free-spirited airtime sales manager, Lisa, in The Dream Makers.

In 2015, Lim won The New Paper's Babe of the Year for the second time after her first win in 2011. In the same year, she won the Best Actress award in Star Awards 2015 for her portrayal of Zhang Xueqin in Yes We Can!.

In 2016, as part of a marketing campaign for NTUC Income, an insurance agency in Singapore, Lim announced she is retiring via her Instagram account. The general public believed that she is retiring and the campaign drew backlash when she clarified during a press conference it was part of a marketing campaign and she is not retiring. 

In 2016, Lim was awarded the Asian Star Award during Seoul International Drama Awards for her role, Wan Fei Fei in The Journey: Our Homeland, a national building trilogy drama. In the same year, she was also nominated in the Best Actress award for Star Awards 2016 for her role Du Jun Ning in Sealed with a Kiss.

In 2017, Lim was nominated in the Best Actress award for Star Awards 2017 for her role Guan Xin Ni in You can be an Angel 2, a drama to show appreciation to healthcare workers in Singapore.

In 2018, Lim won the Star Awards for Best Actress for the drama The Lead in Star Awards 2018.

In 2019, Lim was nominated for Best Actress Award for her role as Chen Chun Xian/Luna for the drama Blessings 2 in Star Awards 2019.

Personal life 
On 15 November 2021, Lim announced her engagement to Matthew Webster, an assistant vice president with PSA International.

Filmography

Film

Television

Compilation album

Accolades

References

External links 
 Official website

1986 births
Living people
Singaporean people of Hokkien descent
Singaporean television personalities
Singaporean television actresses
Singaporean actresses
Singaporean female models
Victoria Junior College alumni
CHIJ Saint Nicholas Girls' School alumni
Singapore Management University alumni
Singaporean Christians